United States Marine Band is a 1942 American short documentary film directed by Jean Negulesco, featuring the United States Marine Band. It was nominated for an Academy Award at the 15th Academy Awards for Best Short Subject (One-Reel).

Cast
 USMC Band director – William F. Santelmann
 Commandant of the USMC – General Thomas Holcomb

References

External links
 

1942 films
1942 short films
1940s short documentary films
American short documentary films
American black-and-white films
Black-and-white documentary films
Films directed by Jean Negulesco
Documentary films about music and musicians
Documentary films about the United States Marine Corps
1942 documentary films
Warner Bros. short films
1940s English-language films
1940s American films